The Jabiru J230 is an Australian light-sport aircraft, designed and produced by Jabiru Aircraft. The aircraft is supplied as a kit for amateur construction or as a complete ready-to-fly aircraft.

Design and development
The J230 is a two-seat development of the four-seat Jabiru J430, optimized for the US light-sport category, which is restricted to two seats. The J230 uses the same wings and fuselage as the J430, but deletes the back seats, leaving a large baggage compartment.

The J230 features a strut-braced high-wing, a two-seats-in-side-by-side configuration enclosed cockpit with a large rear baggage compartment, fixed tricycle landing gear and a single engine in tractor configuration.

The aircraft is made from composites. The aircraft's recommended installed engine power  and the standard engine used is the  Jabiru 3300 four-stroke powerplant. Construction time from the supplied kit is estimated as 600 hours. The design is approved for night flying.

The J230 is listed on the Federal Aviation Administration's list of approved special light-sport aircraft.

Operational history
By December 2011 one hundred examples had been registered and flown worldwide.

Specifications (J230)

References

External links

Homebuilt aircraft
Light-sport aircraft
Single-engined tractor aircraft
High-wing aircraft